Harry Fuller (5 October 1896 – 13 October 1974) was a South African cricketer. He played in eight first-class matches from 1920/21 to 1926/27.

References

External links
 

1896 births
1974 deaths
South African cricketers
Border cricketers
Western Province cricketers
Cricketers from East London, Eastern Cape